Hagen Bower (born 10 June 1972) is a New Zealand former table tennis player. He competed in the men's singles and the men's doubles events at the 1992 Summer Olympics.

References

External links
 

1972 births
Living people
New Zealand male table tennis players
Olympic table tennis players of New Zealand
Table tennis players at the 1992 Summer Olympics
Sportspeople from Wellington City
20th-century New Zealand people
21st-century New Zealand people